The Thorold Cogeneration Station is a natural gas-fired station owned by Northland Power, brought into operation on March 28, 2010.  The plant formerly supplied steam to the nearby AbitibiBowater paper mill before the mill was indefinitely idled in March 2017.  Power is produced under contract to the Ontario Power Authority.

Description
The Power Station consists of one 170 MW gas turbine, supplied by General Electric, that in a combined cycle configuration also generates steam for a steam turbine, resulting in a combined total of 265 MW. The plant uses both natural gas and landfill gas. In addition to power generation, the Thorold Plant includes two Natural Gas/Waste Gas fired boilers which will provide necessary steam to the paper mill when the Gas Turbine is not in service.

References

External links 

 

Natural gas-fired power stations in Ontario
Thorold